The Outer Space Connection is a 1975 documentary film produced by Alan Landsburg, directed by Fred Warshofsky and narrated by Rod Serling. This documentary was the last in a trilogy of ancient astronaut documentaries produced by Landsburg. This film was one of the last projects that Rod Serling worked on prior to his death in 1975.

Plot
This documentary explores the controversial ancient astronauts theory that extraterrestrials explored the Earth in the distant past. These extraterrestrials had a profound effect on the creation of human life and the founding of civilization after which they left mankind to evolve on its own with a promise they would return at a future date for an unknown purpose.

Production
Landsburg created two other television documentaries dealing with the ancient astronaut subject. In Search of Ancient Astronauts and In Search of Ancient Mysteries both produced in 1973. All three projects were narrated by Rod Serling. The Outer Space Connection was based on a book by the same name, also written by Landsburg and published by Bantam Books. The documentary was both directed and written by Fred Warshofsky, who also wrote and directed the previous film In Search of Ancient Mysteries.  Parts of the film were shot in Park City, Utah. The film was released by Sunn Classic Pictures who also released the documentary film, Chariots of the Gods, in 1970. This film was released on VHS during the 1980s and is also found on many video sharing sites on the internet.

See also
 In Search of... (TV series)
 Out-of-place artifact
 Xenoarchaeology

References

External links
 
 Watch The Outer Space Connection on the Internet Archive

1975 films
Ancient astronaut speculation
Films shot in Utah
Pseudoscience documentary films
1970s English-language films